Rupert William Hanley (born 29 January 1952) is a former South African first class cricketer.

Due to his long blond hair, Hanley was known as Spook, Afrikaans for ghost. Hanley was a fast medium bowler whose career coincided with South Africa's ban on international cricket. In 1974 he played for the Derek Robins XI (along with fellow South Africans Barry Richards, Tich Smith, Peter Swart and Clive Rice) in England against Pakistan, taking 5/52 in the first innings. In South Africa, Hanley played for various Currie Cup teams from 1971 to 1986, including the dominant Transvaal "Mean Machine" of the 1980s. He played for South Africa in two unofficial "Tests" and 6 limited overs matches against the touring West Indian side in 1984, taking a hat-trick at the Wanderers Stadium and 14 wickets in total.

In England he played for Northamptonshire during the 1984 season, representing the county against the West Indies, and taking 3/27 in the first innings. David Doyle, a peer of Graeme Pollock and one of South Africa's premier batsmen of the era rated Hanley one of the greatest bowlers he faced.

Hanley has the unusual distinction of having taken more wickets than he scored runs (in both first class and List A) over his career.

Hanley is also an accomplished artist.

References

External links
 

1952 births
Living people
Gauteng cricketers
Free State cricketers
South African cricketers
Northamptonshire cricketers
Eastern Province cricketers
D. H. Robins' XI cricketers